The 2020 Copa do Brasil Finals was the final two-legged tie that decided the 2020 Copa do Brasil, the 32nd season of the Copa do Brasil, Brazil's national cup football tournament organised by the Brazilian Football Confederation.

The finals were contested in a two-legged home-and-away format between Grêmio, from Rio Grande do Sul, and Palmeiras, from São Paulo. Grêmio and Palmeiras reached the Copa do Brasil finals for the ninth and fifth time, respectively.

A draw by CBF was held on 14 January 2021 to determine the home-and-away teams for each leg. The finals were originally scheduled to be played on 11 and 17 February 2021, however due to the participation of Palmeiras in the 2020 FIFA Club World Cup the finals were rescheduled. The first leg was hosted by Grêmio at Arena do Grêmio in Porto Alegre on 28 February 2021, while the second leg was hosted by Palmeiras at Allianz Parque in São Paulo on 7 March 2021.

Palmeiras defeated Grêmio 3–0 on aggregate in the finals to win their fourth title. As champions, Palmeiras earned the right to play in the 2021 Supercopa do Brasil against the 2020 Campeonato Brasileiro Série A champions. Palmeiras had already qualified for the 2021 Copa Libertadores group stage and the 2021 Copa do Brasil third round by winning the 2020 Copa Libertadores.

Teams

Road to the final

Note: In all scores below, the score of the home team is given first.

Format
In the finals, the teams played a single-elimination tournament with the following rules:
The finals were played on a home-and-away two-legged basis. The home-and-away teams for both legs were determined by a draw held on 14 January 2021 at the CBF headquarters in Rio de Janeiro, Brazil.
If tied on aggregate, the away goals rule and extra time would not be used and the penalty shoot-out would be used to determine the winners. (Regulations Article 20).

Matches
Pedro Geromel and Leonardo Gomes (Grêmio) and Luan Silva and Emerson Santos (Palmeiras) were ruled out of the finals due to injuries. Patrick de Paula (Palmeiras) was ruled out of the first leg after testing COVID-19 positive.

First leg

Second leg

See also
2020 Campeonato Brasileiro Série A

References

2020
Finals
Copa do Brasil Finals
Grêmio Foot-Ball Porto Alegrense matches
Sociedade Esportiva Palmeiras matches